Vršovice is a district in the city of Prague. It may also refer to:

 Vršovice (Louny District), village in the Ústí nad Labem Region
 Vršovice (Opava District), village in the Moravian-Silesian Region